Satinwood may refer to:

Originally:

 Chloroxylon swietenia, Ceylon, Sri Lanka satinwood or East Indian satinwood
 Zanthoxylum flavum (Syn.: Fagara flava), West Indian, Jamaica, Florida or San Domingo satinwood
More generally, various other woods that can be polished to a high gloss:
 Brosimum rubescens, Red satinwood,  Suriname satinwood
 Ceratopetalum apetalum, Scented satinwood
 , Madagascar satinwood
 Chloroxylon swietenia,  East Indian satinwood
 Cordia alliodora, Satinwood
 Diospyros ferrea (Syn.: Maba buxifolia), Satinwood
 Distemonanthus benthamianus, Yellow or Nigerian, African satinwood
 Euxylophora paraensis, Brazilian satinwood
 Lagerstroemia spp., Asian or Cambodian satinwood
 Liquidambar styraciflua, Satinwood, Nut satinwood
 Murraya exotica; Andaman satinwood
 Murraya paniculata, Satinwood, from Southeast Asia and Australia
 Nematolepis squamea, Satinwood from Australia
 Pericopsis elata, Yellow or African satinwood
 Rhodosphaera rhodanthema, Tulip or Golden satinwood
 Terminalia ivorensis, Satinwood
 Triplochiton scleroxylon, West African satinwood
 Turraeanthus africana, African satinwood
 Vitex lignum-vitae, Satinwood
 Zanthoxylum brachyacanthum, Satinwood
 Zanthoxylum fagara and Concha satinwood Zanthoxylum caribaeum; Florida, Bahama und West Indian satinwood
 Zanthoxylum gilletii, (East) African satinwood
 Zanthoxylum heitzii, Satinwood